Vincent Francis de Sales Ścigalski Blazej (29 January 1782 in Grodzisk Wielkopolski – August 27 or September 27 in 1846 in Gniezno) was a Polish composer , violinist and conductor.

Early life
Ścigalski was born in Grodzisk Wielkopolski. His father was a musician from Lwówka, an official in Grodzisk and director of the band. He studied at the Obra, where there was a Cistercian monastery and where his uncle was a copyist. Later he attended the Mary Magdalene high school in Poznan where one of the music teachers was A. Braun, conductor of the school band. He taught singing and led vocal and instrumental ensembles in his high school and taught the violin. He was a member of a string quartet founded by Fr. Anthony H. Radziwill.

The tradition of music in his family was continued by his son Titus Arkadiusz and his half-brother Joseph was an organist in Grodzisk Wielkopolski.

Career 
In 1821 he became conductor of the cathedral and held this position until 1825. In 1825 he returned to teaching in high school.

On 1 June 1834 he moved to Gniezno where he took over the conducting band of the cathedral and the position of first violinist (virtuoso). During his work in Gniezno he introduced the latest music repertoire and enriched it with his own compositions and arrangements. He was also the librarian and expanded the collections. He founded the Kkapitularnej music school.

Works
Ścigalskiego's compositions are preserved in the archives of the Pauline monastery in Czestochowa and collections coming from Grodzisk Wielkopolski, as well as archdiocesan archives in Poznań and Gniezno, Kornik Library and monasteries in Obra, Gostyn and Poznan parish. Among them are:

 Missa Solemnis in G
 Missa in B 
 Missa in Es
 Polonaise
 Salve Regina
 Symphony in D major
 Te Deum laudamus
 Ex litany D
 Veni Creator

References

1782 births
1846 deaths
Polish classical composers
Polish male classical composers
19th-century classical composers
19th-century male musicians